Hands of a Gunfighter (also known as Hands of Gunman) is a 1965 Spanish-Italian western film directed by Rafael Romero Marchent.

Cast

External links
 

1965 films
1960s Italian-language films
Spaghetti Western films
Spanish Western (genre) films
Italian Western (genre) films
1965 Western (genre) films
Films directed by Rafael Romero Marchent
Films scored by Angelo Francesco Lavagnino
Films produced by Ricardo Sanz
1960s Italian films